Scotland has played international rugby union since 1871, when they beat England in their first Test match. Scotland have competed in every Rugby World Cup. The records listed below only include performances in Test matches. The top five are listed in each category.

Team records

Individual records

References

 

Scotland
records